Todraž is a small settlement southeast of Gorenja Vas in the Municipality of Gorenja Vas–Poljane in the Upper Carniola region of Slovenia.

Name
The name Todraž was first attested in written sources as Witodras in 1291 and 1381 (and Wittodrasy in 1501). These transcriptions indicate that it is derived from *Vitodraž, in turn based on the Slavic personal name Vitodrag.

Uranium mine

The headquarters of the Žirovski Vrh Uranium Mine are in the settlement. The mine was permanently closed in the 1990s and the site has been cleaned up by the company in charge of closing the mine, Rudnik Žirovski Vrh, based in Todraž.

References

External links

Todraž on Geopedia

Populated places in the Municipality of Gorenja vas-Poljane